Pseudopomyza atrimana, is a species of fly in the family Pseudopomyzidae.

Distribution
Europe.

References

Insects described in 1830
Pseudopomyzidae
Taxa named by Johann Wilhelm Meigen
Diptera of Europe